, also known as Anti-Porno, is a 2016 Japanese drama film written and directed by Sion Sono. It was released by Nikkatsu as the fourth film in the reboot of its Roman Porno ("romantic pornography") series. Other directors involved in the series include Hideo Nakata, Akihiko Shiota, Kazuya Shiraishi, and Isao Yukisada.

Plot
Kyōko is a renowned artist and writer trapped in a solitary gilded cage of her own success where she speaks to the phantom memory of her dead sister Taeko. Her assistant Noriko arrives to help her prepare to be interviewed by a prominent lifestyle magazine. Wrestling with nausea and self-doubt, she alleviates her insecurities by subjecting her older assistant to a series of ritual humiliations in front of the others.

A director yells "Cut!" and it is revealed that the two women were playing parts in a pornographic film. Noriko reveals herself to be a prima donna who is frustrated with the fledgling actress Kyōko's amateurish ineptitude and subjects her to humiliations mirroring those in the scripted scene. The layers of the two actresses' true personalities and Kyōko's background are revealed over the course of repeated performances of the scene.

Cast
 Ami Tomite as Kyōko
 Mariko Tsutsui as Noriko
 Asami
 Fujiko
 Ami Fukuda
 Honoka Ishibashi
 Yūya Takayama

Release and reception
The film premiered at the L'Étrange Festival in France on September 7, 2016, and was later released in Japan on January 28, 2017.

At its premiere, it was praised for its feminist take on sexuality. On review aggregator website Rotten Tomatoes, the film has an approval rating of 87% based on 15 reviews, with an average rating of 6.80/10. James Marsh of the South China Morning Post writes that "Sono's effort is easily the most ambitious entry yet in the series of re-imagined softcore entertainments. Not only does it challenge gender roles within the Japanese film industry – and in the country as a whole – but the film also attempts to deconstruct cinema as a voyeuristic narrative medium." He compares it to Sono's previous efforts, finding that it rises "above the director’s previous attempts to champion feminist protagonists". Ela Bittencourt of Slant Magazine wrote: "Cruelty, masochism, parental abuse (in the painter's flashbacks) and schadenfreude of all kinds fuel this feverish op-art dream that turns on us at every corner." 

Some critics praised the film for subverting Nikkatsu's reboot of Roman Porno by boldly critiquing and exposing the sexual exploitation of the film and pornography industries. Nathanael Hood writing for Mubi noted that, for Nikkatsu's reboot, Sono was a seemingly perfect choice. His previous films, especially Love Exposure, Suicide Club, and Tag, show a certain sexual obsession in the director's work. Hood said, 

Other critics argued the film lacked nuance. Chuck Bowen of Slant Magazine said, "Sion Sono, allergic to subtlety, is terrified that we won't notice his detonation of Nikkatsu's sexploitation traditions."

References

External links

 Antiporno Filme Online

2016 films
2010s Japanese-language films
2010s Japanese films
Japanese drama films
2016 drama films
Films directed by Sion Sono
Nikkatsu Roman Porno
Films about pornography